Heri Dono is an Indonesian visual artist as artist painter, sculptor, and installation artist.

Life and work 
Dono was born in Jakarta on June 12, 1960. He studied at the Indonesian Art Institute (Institut Seni Indonesia) in Yogyakarta, where he won the Prize for the Best Painting in 1981 as well as in 1985. He presented his work worldwide in a great number of solo and group exhibitions.

He is mainly active as an installation artist, and works with materials that come from varying places in the world. In his work, known influences can be noticed, like the life of the ordinary man, wayang kulit, becak driver and tau tau sculptures of the Toraja in Sulawesi.<ref name="TMA">Tropical Museum Amsterdam, [http://www.tropenmuseum.nl/-/MUS/37127/Tropenmuseum/Over-Tropenmuseum/Persinformatie/Kritische-kunst-uit-Indonesi Critical art from Indonesia]  </ref>

Dono, who lives and works in Yogyakarta, mixes humoristic comments in his work on political and social problems in Indonesia. In 1998, he won a Prince Claus Award.

His style is often placed in the art form of new internationalism, which is a recent art form of artists in the world that challenge the Western hegemony of art, in contrast with the New Art Movement in the seventies and eighties that chose in favor of a Western expressions in art, with it taking leave of local traditions.

Dono is represented by Baik Art, which has spaces in Los Angeles and Seoul.

 Solo exhibitions 
 1988: Cemeti Contemporary Art Gallery, Yogyakarta, Indonesia; Mitra Budaya Indonesia Gallery, Jakarta, Indonesia; Bentara Budaya Gallery, Jogjakarta, Indonesia 
 1991: Unknown Dimensions, Museum fur Volkerkunde, Basel, Switzerland.
 1993: Canberra Contemporary Art Space, ACT, Australia
 1996: Blooming in Arms, Museum of Modern Art, Oxford, England.
 2000: Dancing Demons and Drunken Deities, The Japan Foundation Forum, Tokyo, Jepang
 2001: Trap’s outer Rim, Cemeti Art House, Jogjakarta, Indonesia
 2001: Fortress of the Heart, Gajah Gallery, Singapore
 2002: Interrogation, Center A, Vancouver, Canada
 2002: Heri Memprovokasi Heri, Nadi Gallery, Jakarta, Indonesia
 2002: Free-DOM, Bentara Budaya, Jakarta, Indonesia
 2002: Reworking Tradition I & II, Singapore
 2003: Upside Down Mind, CP Artspace, Washington, VS
 2003: Heri Dono, Australian Print Workshop, Melbourne, Australia
 2003: Perjalanan Spiritual Heri Dono, Galeri Semarang, Indonesia
 2004: Who’s Afraid of Donosaurus?, Galeri Nasional Indonesia, Jakarta
 2006: Broken Angels, Gertrude Street Gallery, Melbourne, Australia
 2009-10: Critical Art from Indonesia'', Tropenmuseum, Amsterdam
 2011: "Madman Butterfly", Rossi & Rossi, London

References

External links 

 Heri Dono 
 Heri Dono at Baik Art
 Baik Art and Ocula

Indonesian painters
Indonesian sculptors
Living people
1960 births
People from Jakarta